Ned Burns is an American businessman and politician serving as a member of the Idaho House of Representatives from the 26th district. He was appointed to the seat on December 23, 2021, succeeding Marianna Davis.

Early life and education 
Burns was born and raised in Twin Falls, Idaho. He studied business management at the University of Montana.

Career 
Burns began his career in the restaurant industry before becoming a real estate agent in the Wood River Valley region. He has since worked for Coldwell Banker and served as the mayor of Bellevue, Idaho. Burns was appointed to the Idaho House of Representatives by Governor Brad Little in December 2021, succeeding Marianna Davis.

References 

Living people
People from Twin Falls, Idaho
People from Bellevue, Idaho
Democratic Party members of the Idaho House of Representatives
Year of birth missing (living people)